Uropterygius kamar is a moray eel found in coral reefs in the Pacific and Indian Oceans. It is commonly known as the barlip reef-eel, barlip snakemoray, moon moray, or the moon snake moray.

References

kamar
Fish described in 1977